Masuka is a surname. Notable people with the surname include: 
Anxious Jongwe Masuka
Dorothy Masuka
Vince Masuka